Jedediah Kilburn Smith (November 7, 1770 - December 17, 1828) was a U.S. Representative from New Hampshire.

Born in Amherst, New Hampshire, Smith completed preparatory studies, then studied law. He was admitted to the bar and commenced practice at Amherst in 1800. He served as member of the New Hampshire House of Representatives in 1803, and served as member of the New Hampshire Senate, 1804–1806 and 1809.

Smith was elected as a Democratic-Republican to the Tenth Congress (March 4, 1807 – March 3, 1809). He was an unsuccessful candidate for the United States Senate in 1810. He was a Councilor, 1810–1815, and was Postmaster at Amherst from May 19, 1819, until his successor was appointed on March 15, 1826. He served as associate justice of the court of common pleas, 1816–1821, and of the court of sessions, 1821-1823.  He was chief justice of the court of sessions, 1823-1825.

He died in Amherst on December 17, 1828.

References

1770 births
1828 deaths
Democratic-Republican Party members of the United States House of Representatives from New Hampshire
Members of the New Hampshire House of Representatives
New Hampshire state senators
New Hampshire state court judges